Ciklum is an international software development and IT outsourcing company founded in Denmark in 2002. It is headquartered in London, United Kingdom.

The company has software development centers and branch offices in the United Kingdom, United States, United Arab Emirates, Spain,  Switzerland, Denmark, Israel, Poland, Ukraine, and Pakistan.

Social responsibility and educational initiatives
In 2011, Ciklum partnered together with other companies in order to create BIONIC Hill Innovation Park - a Ukrainian innovation park constructed similarly to the Silicon Valley.

In September 2012, Ciklum co-launched BIONIC University, the first Ukrainian intercorporate IT university working on the premises of National University of Kyiv-Mohyla Academy. The University prepares IT specialists of a new formation, who were globally competitive yet aiming at professional fulfillment in Ukraine.

In April 2014, Ciklum, together with other IT companies operating in Ukraine, initiated the launch of Brain Basket Foundation to fund free trainings for those who wish to study programming. This initiative is aimed at developing Ukraine's $2 billion IT Industry towards a goal of generating $10 billion in annual revenue and creating 100,000 jobs by 2020. Ciklum has pledged $100,000 to the program.

In January 2018, Ciklum supported the first-ever Ukraine House in Davos during the 2018 World Economic Forum.

Clients and services
Ciklum provides services including custom development, quality engineering, data & analytics, Robotic Process Automation, Product development and Consulting.

Ciklum provides teams, project-based services, and peak resources on a short-term basis. Ciklum key clients are eToro, Just Eat, Betsson, and TUI.

History

Ciklum was founded in 2002 by Danish native Torben Majgaard who chaired the Board by 2019, in Kyiv, Ukraine. Since then, the company has grown to over 3,500 employees.

In 2009, Ciklum buys main business activities from Mondo's bankruptcy.

In 2011, Ciklum acquires 50% of SCR Gruppen (Denmark).

In 2013, Ciklum acquires Danish IT outsourcing provider Kuadriga.

In 2015, George Soros's Ukrainian Redevelopment Fund acquired a significant stake in Ciklum.

In 2017, Michael Boustridge was appointed CEO.

In 2019, Ciklum raised a new investment led by Dragon Capital with AVentures Capital co-investment.

Since February 2020, Ciklum's CEO has been Kulraj Smagh.

In 2022, since the beginning of the Russian invasion, the company's top management and Ciklum investors have personally directed more than UAH 40 million to organizations that help the Armed Forces and citizens of the country who suffered as a result of the war. Separately, Ciklum allocated UAH 1.5 million to finance the Ukrainian army. In addition, Ciklum continued to develop the from Patriots to Patriots program for donations from employee income. It means the company will double the collected funds and direct them to support the army.

See also 

 Softserve
 EPAM
 Eleks
 Infopulse Ukraine
 DataArt

References

Software companies of Ukraine
Development software companies
Software companies established in 2002
Outsourcing companies
Software companies of Denmark
Software companies of the United Kingdom
2002 establishments in the United Kingdom